Chang Tang National Nature Reserve lies in the northern Tibetan Plateau. Administratively, it lies in Xainza County and Biru County of the Nagqu Prefecture. With the more recently established adjoining reserves listed below there is now a total of 496,000 km (191,507 sq. miles) of connected Nature Reserves, which represents an area almost as large as Spain and bigger than 197 other countries.

History 

With assistance from the internationally renowned animal behaviourist and naturalist, George Schaller, the Chang Tang Nature Reserve was originally established by the government of Tibet Autonomous Region in 1993 to protect its fragile ecosystem. The reserve spans the vast and sparsely inhabited northern Tibetan Changtang plateau. The reserve had since been expanded over time. It was upgraded to a "National Protected Area" in April 2000 by the Chinese Government. It is currently listed as an IUCN Category: VI - Managed Resource Protected Area.

Geography 

The Changtang (Tibetan for "Northern plain") is a massive high-altitude plateau stretching from Ladakh in India, across northern Tibet into Qinghai Province, and north into the Nanshan mountains of Xinjiang Province. The Chang Tang Nature Reserve includes most of the Chinese portion of the plateau.

As the highest nature reserve in the world, the Chang Tang has an average altitude over 4,800 metres (16,000 feet) with "high rolling hills, and plains interspersed by mountains over 20,000 feet [6,000 metres] high." It is extremely cold in winter with temperatures dropping to minus 40 degrees at night. Travel is easier in the winter because summer can be very wet and vehicles get bogged easily.

New reserves bordering the Chang Tang Nature Reserve have been added in recent years:

 The "Mid-Kunlun Reserve" is directly to the north of the Changtang Nature Reserve. It 32,000 km. and was established in 2001. It also borders the "Arjin Shan (or "Altun Tagh") Reserve" on its east.
 The "Xianza Reserve" Nature Reserve in the Tibet Autonomous Region is 40,000 km, and is directly to the south of the Chang Tang Nature Reserve. It was established in 1993 and contains the Siling Lake.
 The "Arjin Shan (or "Altun Tagh") Reserve," 45,000 sq. km in the Xinjiang Autonomous Region, was established in 1983, is to the northeast of the Chang Tang Nature Reserve.
 The "Kekexili (aka "Kokoxili" or "Hoh Xil") National Reserve" in Qinghai Province, is 45,000 km, and was established in 1995. It borders the "Mid-Kunlun Reserve" to the south (and is to the east of the Chang Tang Nature Reserve).

In addition, there are two more proposed reserves on the borders of the Chang Tang Nature Reserve: to the south of the Kekexili Reserve, and to the west of the Mid-Kunlun Reserve.  If these proposed new reserves are established, the vast majority of the range of the Chiru, and almost all the spring migration routes of the female Chiru will be protected.

Population 

It is home to only a few Tibetan nomads and various park staff hired to prevent poaching.

Flora and fauna 

Here are some of the last remaining herds of wild ungulates: Wild yak (Bos mutus), Tibetan wild ass or kiang (Equus kiang), Himalayan blue sheep or Bharal (Pseudois nayaur), Argali (Ovis ammon), Tibetan gazelle (Procapra picticaudata) and Tibetan antelope or chiru (Pantholops hodgsonii). Chiru wool is considered the finest known, and is smuggled, especially to Kashmir, India where it is woven into shahtoosh shawls. Predators include snow leopards (Panthera uncia or Uncia uncia), Tibetan wolves (Canis lupus filchneri), Turkestan lynx (Lynx lynx isabellinus) and Tibetan blue bears (Ursus arctos pruinosus). At the bottom end of the food chain are large numbers of pika (Ochotona spp.).

The vegetation is open shrubland and grasslands mainly dominated by Stipa grasses and Kobresia species ("bog sedges").

See also 
 Protected areas of China

References

Citations

Sources 
 Dorje, Gyurme. (2009) Footprint Tibet Handbook. 4th Edition. Bath, U.K.
 Ridgeway (2003). "275 miles on foot through the remote Chang Tang." Rick Ridgeway, photos by Galen Rowell. National Geographic Magazine. April 2003.
 "Snow Leopard Survival Strategy." (2003) Edited by Thomas M. McCarthy & Guillaume Chapron. Downloadable as pdf from: 
 Daniel Miller (2003). "Tibet: Environmental Analysis.". Downloadable from:

External links
 Downloadable National Geographic map 
 Wildlife Conservation Society, "Saving Wild Places - Chang Tang, Tibetan Plateau - China"
 American Biologist Praises Tibetan Wildlife Conservation (07/11/03).
 Care 4 Nature, "Habitat of Chiru".
 "A Resurgence of Wildlife in Northern Tibet" by Alex Chadwick.
 A Conversation with Dr. George Schaller
 HKH Conservation Portal, "Changthang National Protected Area"
 Qinghai kekexili Nature Reserve

National parks of China
Biosphere reserves of China
Protected areas established in 1993
Geography of Tibet
Geography of Qinghai
Nagqu
1993 establishments in China
Ngari Prefecture